Ile des Phoques (also called Isle du Phoques) is a rugged granite island, with an area of 8 ha, part of the Schouten Island Group, lying close to the eastern coast of Tasmania, Australia near the Freycinet Peninsula. 

Seal hunting took place here from at least 1805. Captain James Kelly is recorded sealing here during his 1816 circumnavigation of Tasmania.

It is a nature reserve.

Fauna
Recorded breeding seabird species are little penguin, short-tailed shearwater, fairy prion and common diving-petrel. White-bellied sea-eagles have nested on the island. Australian fur seals haul-out there and there is historical evidence that it was once a major breeding colony.

References

East Coast Tasmania
Islands of South East Tasmania
Protected areas of Tasmania
Seal hunting